Luna Lauren Vélez (born November 2, 1964) is an American actress and the identical twin sister of actress Lorraine Vélez. Her most notable television roles are as María LaGuerta on Showtime's Dexter, Detective Nina Moreno on Fox's New York Undercover, Dr. Gloria Nathan on HBO's prison drama Oz, and Elena on ABC's comedy-drama Ugly Betty. She also starred as Rio Morales in Spider-Man: Into the Spider-Verse (2018).

Early life and education
In the early 1950s, Vélez's parents moved from Puerto Rico to Brooklyn, New York, where she and her identical twin sister, Lorraine Vélez, were born. The twins have five other sisters and one brother. Vélez's father, a New York City Police Department officer, eventually bought a house in Far Rockaway, Queens, and moved the family there. The twins staged improvised plays and acting for the family and participated in nearly all their high school drama productions, such as Fiddler on the Roof. After graduating from Beach Channel High School in 1982, they received scholarships to attend the Alvin Ailey Dance School. They went on to study acting at The Acting Studio - New York with its founding artistic director James Price, protégé and personal friend of Sanford Meisner. Lauren also studied Shakespeare with Michael Howard.

Career

Vélez landed her first performing job in the national touring company of the musical Dreamgirls. She was also an understudy for actress Phylicia Rashad in Stephen Sondheim's Into the Woods, and performed Off-Broadway in productions of Much Ado About Nothing.

In 1994, Vélez made her film debut as Lisette Linares in the movie I Like It Like That alongside Rita Moreno and Jon Seda. In 1995, Vélez landed her first major television role as Nina Moreno, a policewoman, in the TV series New York Undercover. She was nominated for the Independent Spirit Award and The Desi Award for Best Lead Actress. The movie was nominated for four Independent Spirit Awards and won an NYFCCA award. Another TV series in which she performed was HBO's jail drama Oz. She also acted in the feature film City Hall (1996) with Al Pacino. In 1997, she starred in Buscando un Sueño (In Search of a Dream), the first Spanish-language film sanctioned by SAG. She played police lieutenant María LaGuerta, in a major supporting role on Showtime's series Dexter.

On June 24, 2006, Vélez won the Best Supporting Actress award at the 2006 Long Island International Film Expo for her performance as Roseanne Crystal in the independent feature film Serial.

In 2010, she received the Rita Moreno HOLA Award for Excellence from the Hispanic Organization of Latin Actors (HOLA).

Filmography

Film

Television

Theatre

See also

List of Puerto Ricans

References

External links

 
  https://www.instagram.com/lunalaurenvelez/

1964 births
Actresses from New York City
American film actresses
American actresses of Puerto Rican descent
American stage actresses
American television actresses
Identical twin actresses
Living people
People from Brooklyn
American twins
20th-century American actresses
21st-century American actresses
People from Far Rockaway, Queens